Christopher Bailey is the name of:

Christopher Bailey (fashion designer) (born 1971), Chief Creative and CEO of Burberry
Christopher Bailey (screenwriter), lecturer and Doctor Who screenwriter

See also
Chris Bailey (disambiguation)
Chris Baillie (disambiguation)
Christopher Bayly (1945–2015), British historian
Bailey (surname)